The Treaty of Björkö, also known as the Treaty of Koivisto, was a secret mutual defence accord signed on 24 July 1905 in Björkö between Wilhelm II of the German Empire and Tsar Nicholas II of Russia. Wilhelm was the chief author, but he acted without consulting his ministers. It was quickly repudiated and never took effect.

Secret meeting

This secret mutual defence treaty was signed at a meeting that had been only been arranged by Wilhelm II four days beforhand. On the evening of Sunday 23 July 1905, the Kaiser arrived at Koivisto Sound from Viipuri Bay in his yacht, the Hohenzollern, which then dropped anchor near Tsar Nicholas' yacht, the Standart. Proof that the meeting took place is given by telegrams that they exchanged, dubbed the Willy–Nicky correspondence, which was made public in 1917 by the new revolutionary government in Russia.

Treaty
The overall defence treaty contained four articles and was signed by Wilhelm II and Tsar Nicholas II, and further was countersigned by Heinrich von Tschirschky, head of the German Foreign Office, and Naval Minister Aleksei Birilev:

Their Majesties the Emperors of all the Russias and Germany, in order to ensure the continuance of peace in Europe have decreed the following Articles of a Defensive Alliance Treaty.

Article I

In case one of the two Empires is attacked by a European Power, his ally will help it in Europe with all its land and sea forces.

Article II

High Contracting Parties undertake not to conclude separate peace with any common adversary.

Article III

The present Treaty shall enter into force as soon as peace between Russia and Japan is concluded and shall remain valid as long as it is not denounced a year in advance.

Article IV

The Emperor of all the Russias, after the entry into force of this treaty, will take the necessary steps to initiate France to this agreement and engage it to join as an ally.

Signature
Wilhelm I.R.     Nicolas

Von Tschirschky und Brogendorff     Birilev.

Reaction

The treaty needed to be ratified by both the German and Russian governments.

Germany

The driving motive for the treaty on the German side was to undermine the Franco-Russian Alliance and to strengthen Germany’s position vis-à-vis Britain.  Initially drafted as a global mutual defence pact, Wilhelm’s insertion of the words "en Europe" into the first article, thereby restricting the treaty’s remit to Europe, put the Kaiser at odds with the German Reich Chancellor, Bernhard von Bülow, who had not been forewarned of the late amendment. Bülow took the view that Russia’s support would be needed in relation to the British presence in India, but Wilhelm thought such operations would just draw Germany into a fruitless war in that region at the expense of Germany’s position in Europe. Bülow threatened to resign over the disagreement, which prompted a melodramatic letter from the Kaiser ending with the words, “if a letter of resignation arrived from you, the next morning would find the Kaiser no longer alive! Think of my poor wife and children!” Bülow therefore offered to compromise, but before the issue could be resolved on the German side, the Russian government rejected the agreement.

Russia

Although Tsar Nicholas had signed the treaty, it was not ratified by his government because of the pre-existing Franco-Russian Alliance. Russian Prime Minister Sergey Witte and Foreign Minister Vladimir Lambsdorff had been neither present at the signing nor consulted beforehand; they insisted that the treaty should not come into effect unless it was approved and signed by France. Lambsdorff told the Tsar that it was "inadmissible to promise at the same time the same thing to two governments whose interests were mutually antagonistic". The Tsar gave in to their pressure, much to the consternation of the Kaiser, who reproached his cousin: "We joined hands and signed before God, who heard our vows!... What is signed, is signed! and God is our testator!" Wilhelm's chancellor, Count Bernhard von Bülow, however, also refused to sign the treaty because the Kaiser had added an amendment to the draft, against the advice of the Foreign Office, which limited the treaty to Europe.

References

Sources
Cecil, Lamar. Wilhelm II. UNC Press, 1996. .
Clark, Christopher. Kaiser Wilhelm II: A Life in Power. Penguin, 2009. 
Fay, Sidney B. The Kaiser's Secret Negotiations with the Tsar, 1904-1905. American Historical Review 24#1 (1918), pp. 48–72. online
 McLean, Roderick R. "Dreams of a German Europe: Wilhelm II and the Treaty of Björkö of 1905." in The Kaiser: New Research on Wilhelm II’s Role in Imperial Germany (2003): 119-141. </ref> 
Reynolds, David. Summits. Six Meetings That Shaped the World. Basic Books, 2007. 
Die Grosse Politik der Europäischen Kabinette 1871-1914, Vol.19, "Chapter 138: Der Vertrag von Björkoe" (pp. 433–528), 1927; primary sources (in German).

Bjorko
20th-century military alliances
Bjorko
Bjorko
Military alliances involving the German Empire
Military alliances involving Russia
1905 in Germany
1905 in the Russian Empire
Wilhelm II, German Emperor
Nicholas II of Russia
Germany–Russia relations
Bilateral treaties of Russia